"My Generation" is a song by the American rap rock band Limp Bizkit from their third studio album, Chocolate Starfish and the Hot Dog Flavored Water (2000). It was released as the second and third single simultaneously, along with "Rollin'", on September 5, 2000.

Content
It contains lyrical references to the songs "My Generation" by the Who, "Welcome to the Jungle" by Guns N' Roses and "Move Over" by the Spice Girls, One Flew Over the Cuckoo's Nest, Titanic and Macromedia's Shockwave Flash plugin. Musically, the song displays the interplay between guitarist Wes Borland and drummer John Otto as the two's musical parts are tightly intertwined in a similar way to how the bass and drums intertwine in Primus, who have influenced Limp Bizkit and toured with them.

Music video
The music video for "My Generation" shows Limp Bizkit performing live on an acrylic glass stage, while other scenes show their fans being rebellious outside the Astrodome. During the breakdown of the song, each band member is shown separately, disappearing and reappearing.

Professional wrestler Robyn Logan, who worked as a bodyguard for the band at the time, makes an appearance in the video pulling Fred Durst out of the crowd.

The rock band Staind also performed on this very same stage in the video for their single "Mudshovel".

Reception
In 2022, Louder Sound and Kerrang ranked the song number three and number two, respectively, on their lists of Limp Bizkit's greatest songs.

Track listing
The song was released as two different singles (parts) with slightly different covers.

CD2:
 "My Generation" (Radio Edit)
 "It's Like That Y'All" (Non-LP Version)
 "Snake in Your Face" (Non-LP Version)

CD1:
 "My Generation" (Album Version)
 "Back o Da Bus" (Non-LP Version)
 "Faith" (LP Version)

Charts

Release history

References

External links
 

Limp Bizkit songs
2000 singles
2000 songs
Flip Records (1994) singles
Interscope Records singles
Music videos directed by Fred Durst
Number-one singles in Portugal
Songs written by Fred Durst
Songs written by John Otto (drummer)
Songs written by Sam Rivers (bassist)
Songs written by Wes Borland